Dehra Gopipur is a town, a Municipal Council, and a Tehsil in Kangra district  in the state of Himachal Pradesh, India. 
The River Beas divides the town into Dera (or Dehra) & Gopipur. The town of Dehra is as recent as mid-15th century when foreign invaders used this place as a dera (camp) for their expedition to hill states. British made the evolving town as the tehsil in year 1868. The official name of the town during British Raj was Dera.

Geography
It has an average elevation of 503 metres (1,650 feet). River Beas also flows past Dera. Pong reservoir (Maharana Pratap reservoir) is also a nearby major structure.

Demographics
 India census, Dehra Gopipur had a population of 4336. Males constitute 52% of the population and females 48%. Dehra Gopipur has an average literacy rate of 79%, higher than the national average of 59.5%: male literacy is 82% and, female literacy is 76%. In Dehra Gopipur, 11% of the population is under 6 years of age.

Places of interest
Bagulamukhi temple, devoted to the goddess Bagulamukhi. President of India Sh. Pranav Mukherjee has also paid his obedience in this temple.

Pragpur, a small hamlet in the Dera Gopipur, has been listed as the only World Heritage village in India. It is known for its history as well as for an executive clan of 'Sood' (some write it as 'Sud') community.  Three other hamlets, named Garli, Nagrota Bagwan and Chamba Pattan lie in close vicinity to Paragpur.

Other nearby towns include Rancer Island in Nagrota Surian, Jawalamukhi (a famous temple and one of the most visited religious shrines of Hindus); Hamirpur (the commercial hub of Himachal Pradesh); Kangra (known for its forts, temples and rich cultural heritage); and Nadaun (a place still remembered for having a Sikh's Gurdwara which was built to commemorate Guru Gobind Singh's victory in the Battle of Nadaun.
Kaleshwar Temple: At a distance of around 15 km, this place has got great religious importance as pandavas stayed here during exile. Baisakhi fair is held on every 13 April. 
Pong river basin is a bird sanctuary included in Ramsar Wetlands list. Millions of Siberian birds visit it every year.
Boating and water-sports is available in Dera and Chambapattan, Kaleshwar. Dera has great potential for water sports and tourism, but various governments had failed to develop it.

Pong Dam

As River Beas flows from the sub town it ends up in the Pong Dam reservoir/lake, also known as Maharana Pratap Sagar.  This man made lake is 45 km long & 15–18 km wide.  It attracts a lot of anglers come for fishing mahasher fish.   
 
Dehra Town is so beautiful and it could become one of the most famous place among the historical place and it can also develop itself through various channels of development like National level Fairs, crafting etc.

References

External links
Heritage Zone Garli Pragpur Kangra Pongdam
The Indian National Trust For Art and Cultural Heritage was set up to Protect and Conserve India's vast Natural and Cultural Heritage
 Kangra Kangra district Official website.

Cities and towns in Kangra district
Tehsils of Himachal Pradesh